Christopher Gäng (born 10 May 1988) is a German former professional footballer who played as a goalkeeper.

Career 
He made his professional debut for Hertha in the Bundesliga on 11 November 2008 against Werder Bremen when the first goalkeeper, Jaroslav Drobný was injured. He allowed five goals in a 5–1 loss and did not play for the first team anymore until he left.

For the 2013–14 season, Gäng moved to SG Sonnenhof Großaspach in the Regionalliga Südwest. In June 2016, Gäng returned to his hometown of Mannheim and signed a three-year contract with SV Waldhof Mannheim. Ahead of the 2019–20 season, his contract with the club was not extended.

Personal life
In 2013, Gäng revealed that he had suffered from gambling addiction, obesity and depression during his football career, criticising the sport as "prostitution".

References

External links 
 
 

1988 births
Living people
Footballers from Mannheim
German footballers
Association football goalkeepers
Bundesliga players
SV Waldhof Mannheim players
Hertha BSC players
Hertha BSC II players
RB Leipzig players
SG Sonnenhof Großaspach players
1. FC Lokomotive Leipzig players
3. Liga players
Regionalliga players